Vivrant Sharma (born 30 October 1999) is an Indian cricketer. He made his List A debut on 21 February 2021, for Jammu & Kashmir in the 2020–21 Vijay Hazare Trophy. He made his Twenty20 debut on 4 November 2021, for Jammu & Kashmir in the 2021–22 Syed Mushtaq Ali Trophy. He was bought by Sunrisers Hyderabad for 2.6 crore, 13 times his base price in the IPL 2023 mini-auction.

References

External links
 

1999 births
Living people
Indian cricketers
Jammu and Kashmir cricketers
Place of birth missing (living people)